Batz may refer to:

People
Philipp Mainländer (AKA Philipp Batz, 1841–1876), German poet and philosopher
Charles de Batz-Castelmore d'Artagnan ( - 1673), famous French Musketeer of the Guard
A Utrecht family of organ makers of German descent, of whom Johann Heinrich Hartmann Bätz (1709-1770) represents the eldest generation

Music
Guana Batz, an English psychobilly band

Places
Batz-sur-Mer, a French commune of the Loire-Atlantique department
Île de Batz, a French island off Roscoff in Brittany